Chaminda Handunnettige (born 19 October 1970) is a Sri Lankan former cricketer. He played 75 first-class and 35 List A matches for several domestic sides in Sri Lanka between 1988 and 2003. He is now an umpire and stood in matches in the 2017–18 Premier Limited Overs Tournament.

References

External links
 

1970 births
Living people
Sri Lankan cricketers
Sri Lankan cricket umpires
Bloomfield Cricket and Athletic Club cricketers
Burgher Recreation Club cricketers
Colombo Cricket Club cricketers
Kurunegala Youth Cricket Club cricketers
Nondescripts Cricket Club cricketers
Place of birth missing (living people)